Prince Clemens Wenceslaus of Saxony (German: Clemens Wenzeslaus August Hubertus Franz Xaver von Sachsen) (28 September 1739 – 27 July 1812) was a Saxon prince from the House of Wettin and the Archbishop-Elector of Trier from 1768 until 1803, the Prince-Bishop of Freising from 1763 until 1768, the Prince-Bishop of Regensburg from 1763 until 1769, and the Prince-Bishop of Augsburg from 1768 until 1812.

Biography
Clemens Wenceslaus was the ninth child of the Prince-Elector Augustus III of Saxony, who was also the King of Poland. In 1760 he went to Vienna and entered the Austrian army as a field marshal. He was present at the Battle of Torgau (3 November 1760), but he decided that warfare was not for him and instead entered the church. On 18 and 27 April 1763 he was elected the Bishops of Freising and Regensburg, respectively, but he abandoned these dioceses for the Archbishopric-Electorate of Trier and the Prince-Bishopric of Augsburg in February and August 1768, respectively, where he already functioned as coadjutor since 1764.

As Archbishop-Elector, Clemens Wenceslaus greatly improved public education, established several non-profit organisations for general education and prosperity, and in 1783 raised an edict of tolerance. He took a mixed view in spiritual affairs. He allowed the Jesuits to remain in Trier after abolishing their order, protested the radical reforms of his cousin, the Emperor Joseph II, and banned several processions and holidays. Although a modest person who lived simply, he rebuilt Ehrenbreitstein into a magnificent palace and dwelt there. He established the theatre in Coblenz and encouraged music in the archdiocese. Clemens Wenceslaus enjoyed hunting and established a hunting lodge at Kärlich, though he was opposed to several inhumane ways of hunting.

With the outbreak of the French Revolution at the end of the 18th Century, Clemens Wenceslaus became worried. He ceased all reforms and began to rule strictly. He offered refuge to members of the French royal family (King Louis XVI was his nephew) in Schönbornslust palace, and allowed Coblenz to become a centre of French monarchism. He and the archbishopric-electorate were greatly affected by the success of the French revolutionary forces, and at the Treaty of Lunéville in 1801 he lost all lands of the electorate west of the River Rhine, retaining only a few small territories pertaining to Trier itself. In 1803 he lost those as well, along with the Prince-Bishopric of Augsburg and the Prince-Provostry of Ellwangen Abbey, which were secularized and annexed by the princes of Nassau-Weilburg, the Elector of Bavaria, and the Duke of Württemberg, respectively. Clemens Wenceslaus received a pension of 100,000 guldens and retired to Augsburg, dying in the episcopal summer residence in Marktoberdorf in Allgäu in 1812. He was buried there.

His grandniece Archduchess Maria Clementina of Austria was named after him. Archduchess Maria Clementina was a daughter of Leopold II, Holy Roman Emperor and Maria Luisa of Spain. Maria Luisa was his niece by his sister Maria Amalia of Saxony.

Ancestry

References 

|-

|-

1739 births
1812 deaths
People from Wermsdorf
People from the Electorate of Saxony
Saxon princes
House of Wettin
Archbishop-Electors of Trier
Roman Catholic Prince-Bishops of Freising
History of Augsburg
Albertine branch
18th-century Roman Catholic bishops in Bavaria
Recipients of the Order of the White Eagle (Poland)
Sons of kings